The Associated Press Trophy is the annual award given by the Associated Press (AP) to the team ranked No. 1 in the season's final AP Poll. The trophy is emblematic of the college football national championship as awarded by the Associated Press.

The current version of trophy consists of a silver or gold football suspended above a base which contains the letters "AP" (for Associated Press), along with the information on who the recipient of the trophy was.

Until the 1968 college football season, the final AP poll of the season was released following the end of the regular season, with the exception of the 1965 season.

Prior to the College Football Playoff (CFP) and Bowl Championship Series (BCS), the NCAA had not held a tournament or championship game to determine the national champion of what is now the highest level, NCAA Division I Football Bowl Subdivision (FBS) due to the long-standing historical ties between individual college football conferences and high-paying bowl games like the Rose Bowl and Orange Bowl. The NCAA did, however, recognize a national champion based upon the final results of major "wire-service" (AP and Coaches') polls. The extent of that recognition came in the form of acknowledgment in the annual NCAA Football Guide of the "unofficial" national champions. As a result, the public and the media began to acknowledge the leading vote-getter in the final AP Poll as the national champion for that season.

The Associated Press was not tied to the BCS, and the trophy could be awarded to a team which did not win the BCS National Championship Game. This has happened once after the 2003 season when LSU won the BCS title game, but USC received a higher total of votes in the AP Poll, and therefore received the AP National Championship Trophy. Teams serving NCAA postseason bans are still eligible for the AP National Championship. This has occurred twice, following the 1957 and 1974 seasons.

Trophies

No trophy (1936–1940)

In its initial years, the AP Poll did not award a trophy.

The preeminent national championship trophy of the era was the Knute Rockne Memorial Trophy awarded by the Dickinson System. Following the retirement of Frank G. Dickinson and his rating system in 1940, Minnesota tasked the AP Poll with awarding the new trophy it put into play.

Williams Trophy (1941–1947)

From 1941–1947, the No. 1 team in the final Associated Press poll was awarded the Dr. Henry L. Williams Trophy. The trophy, named in honor of Minnesota head coach Henry L. Williams, was donated by the Golden Gophers after they permanently retired the Dickinson System's Rockne Trophy by winning it for the third time in 1940.

The Williams trophy was retired when it was won for the third time by Notre Dame in 1947.

O'Donnell Trophy (1948–1956)

Following their retirement of the Williams trophy, Notre Dame donated the Rev. J. Hugh O'Donnell Memorial Trophy to be presented to the 1948 national champion as determined by the Associated Press poll. Like the previous college football national championship trophies, it was to be permanently retired by the first team to win it three times.

Oklahoma retained permanent possession of the O'Donnell trophy after winning it for the third time in 1956.

Bryant Trophy (1957–1965)

A dedicated Associated Press Trophy was commissioned following the retirement of the O'Donnell Trophy by Oklahoma. The AP Trophy was first awarded to Auburn for their 1957 AP national championship. Like the previous national championship trophies, the "huge, 40-inch high, bronze" Associated Press trophy would be kept by the first school to win it three times.

This original "big, silver" AP trophy was retired by Alabama in 1965, upon winning their third AP title in five years. Upon permanently awarding the trophy to Alabama, the Associated Press named it the Paul W. Bryant Trophy. This AP trophy is still held by Alabama and is on display at the Paul W. Bryant Museum on the university campus in Tuscaloosa.

AP Trophy (1966–1977)

Another traveling Associated Press Trophy was awarded from 1966–1977. It was retired permanently by Notre Dame following their third win of the trophy.

Bryant Trophy (1978–1989)

A new traveling Associated Press Trophy was put into competition for the 1978 season. Following the death of the great coach in January 1983, this trophy was renamed the Paul W. "Bear" Bryant Trophy. This same name had previously been given to the AP trophy used from 1957–1965, upon it being won 3 times and retired by the coach's Alabama team.

This Bryant trophy was retired by the University of Miami, which gained permanent possession after their 3 wins in 1983, 1987, and 1989. The trophy currently resides at the University of Miami Sports Hall of Fame.

AP Trophy (1990–present)

Since the conclusion of the 1990 season, the AP has annually awarded an individual Associated Press Trophy to the school that finishes No. 1 in the final AP Poll (signifying that team as the national champion in Division I-A / FBS).

Winners
The following teams have finished in the #1 spot in the final AP Poll of the season for college football:

By year

By school

See also
AP Poll 
AFCA National Championship Trophy
Grantland Rice Trophy
MacArthur Bowl
BCS National Championship Game
College Football Playoff National Championship Trophy
NCAA Division I FBS national football championship

References

College football championship trophies
Associated Press awards